Toufoula is a Lebanese voluntary  health organization dedicated to improve the quality of life of children suffering from cancer and blood diseases by designing and creating a unique and colorful environments aimed at offering a safe haven throughout their treatment. Toufoula was co-founded in 2006 by a group of young volunteers in Beirut, Lebanon.

The word  is Arabic for "Childhood" and the organization mission is to improve the quality of life of children suffering from cancer or blood diseases.

Dream Room Project

Toufoula's main project is the "Dream Rooms"  and its aim is to design a "dream floor" ward in all hospitals where children receive therapy. Dream Rooms aim at derailing the children from the arduous treatment and journey while hospitalized. To that end, Toufoula co-founders started this initiative by upbringing of the idea that was then extrapolated via the collaborative work with other architects and designers.
Toufoula had a number of designs submitted namely by Bernard Khoury, Celia Arbid, Nadim Karam, Simone Kosremelli, Raed Abi Lameh, Karim Chaya, Nada Debs, Erga group: Randa and Elie Gebrayel, Jean Louis Mainguy, Karen Chikerjian, Michele Maria Chaya, Lina Ghotmeh, JWT, Zuhair Murad, Rabih Keyrouz, Gina Succar, Michele Stanjovsky, Jalal Mahmoud, Sary El Khazen and IB2 who contributed a lot for Toufoula by advertising for the concept of the Dream Room project by a slogan " No Color, No life " noticing that IB2 is an expansion unit of Impact BBDO.

This project is to be implemented in all the hospitals that have oncology hematology wards all around Lebanon. It has been implemented in three major hospitals already since the year 2008:

Hotel Dieu de France (HDF): 18 rooms, a playroom and a corridor were executed, their total cost was $195,983 granted from an individual donor. The ward in HDF is in memory of Myrna Baz.
Rafik Hariri University Hospital: 4 rooms were executed, their total cost was $20,471 by donors such as Kockache, Procter and Gamble.
Al Makassed Hospital: 8 rooms, they cost a total of $53,970 from donors such as HSBC, Roche, Novartis and individual funds.
Currently, Notre Dame des Secours funded by the Choueiri family in the memory of M.Antoine Choueiry.

Toufoula has set a goal, that by 2012 all pediatric oncology hospital rooms in Lebanon will be changed into dream rooms.
The hospitals that admit cancer kids in Lebanon are: Rafik Hariri University Hospital, Saint George Hospital - Beirut, Jeitawi, Hotel Dieu, Rizk, Makassed, Notre Dame Des Secours Nini Tripoli and Hammoud Saida.

Objectives

Toufoula’s goals culminate in one main aim: to improve the quality of life of children suffering from cancer.

Create public awareness about the needs of children with cancer.
Provide financial assistance to these children and their families.
Create the most appropriate treatment environment and facilities.
Support all other organizations and individuals that share the same goal.

Achievements

Dream Room Project Copyright registered in the Lebanese Ministry.
Best Costume Award by Beirut Marathon, 2007.
Lebanese American University Recognition Award, 2008.
A Certificate of Appreciation from the Rafik Hariri University Hospital, for Toufoula's participation in the world health day 2010 health fair entitled "My Country, My City, My Health".
A certificate of appreciation from the Garden Show & Spring Festival to Toufoula for participating at the Garden Show & Spring Festival 2010.
A certificate of appreciation from Prime Minister Mr. Ziad Baroud for Toufoula for implementing the dream rooms at Hotel Dieu de France Hospital, 2010.
Beirut International Marathon Recognition Award for 2008.
A certificate of appreciation from FIKR Conference 9 for Toufoula for coming up with a new bright idea the "Dream Rooms", 2010.

Fundraising for patient treatment

Toufoula most importantly raises money to help in the treatment of the sick children

Events
Toufoula depends on fundraising activities and sponsors for its event. To fulfill their objectives several events were done: 

 BIEL: Toufoula organized a carnival which took place from April 28, 2006 until May 1, 2006 at BIEL. 11,000 visitors came over three days; 200 sick children from all over Lebanon, along with their siblings, attended the event; 500 volunteers from various schools and universities across Lebanon helped make this event possible.
 Marathon: Toufoula participated in the Beirut Marathon 2006 by wearing sewed butterfly wings (over 100) while running, winning Toufoula the Best costume for 2006’s Marathon.
 Garden Show: During the opening of Garden Show, Toufoula did a parade with school kids, a juggler and a magic show.
FIKR Conference: hosted by President Michel Sleiman was held at Phoenicia Hotel on December 8–9. Toufoula is selected as the only NGO from all Arab world to present their work at the conference. Mr. Maxime Chaya represented Toufoula, along with other Toufoula members, and patients who are directly supported by Toufoula's mission.

References

Cancer organisations based in Lebanon
2006 establishments in Lebanon
Organizations established in 2006